Kylinxia is a genus of extinct arthropod described in 2020. It was described from six specimens discovered in Yu'anshan Formation (Maotianshan Shales) in southern China. The specimens are assigned to one species Kylinxia zhangi. Dated to 518 million years, the fossils falls under the Cambrian period. Announcing the discovery on 4 November 2020 at a press conference, Zeng Han of the Nanjing Institute of Geology and Paleontology, said that the animal "bridges the evolutionary gap from Anomalocaris to true arthropods and forms a key ‘missing link’ in the origin of arthropods," which was "predicted by Darwin’s evolutionary theory." The same day the formal description was published in Nature.

Discovery 
Kylinxia zhangi was discovered among the Maotianshan Shales from Yu'anshan Formation at Yunnan in southern China in 2019. Zeng Han, Zhao Fangchen, and Huang Diying of the Nanjing Institute of Geology and Palaeontology, Chinese Academy of Sciences, made the formal description and taxonomy in Nature in 2020. They found six specimens which are well preserved and complete. The original specimens (holotype) is kept at the Nanjing Institute of Geology and Palaeontology, while the additional specimens (paratypes) are maintained at the Yingliang Stone Natural History Museum.

Etymology 
The genus name Kylinxia refers to a mixture of arthropod characters; kylin (qilin) is derived from the chimeric creature in Chinese mythology, while xia (蝦) is a Chinese word for shrimp-like arthropod. The species name zhang is after Yehui Zhang who contributed the additional specimens (paratypes).

Description 

Kylinxia is a tiny shrimp-like arthropod, measuring about 5 cm long and about 1.2 cm broad at the widest part of the body. Its body is segmented and divisible into three regions, namely head, trunk and the pygidium. Kylinxia possesses a mixture of characters resembling various Cambrian arthropod taxa, notably Opabinia (eyes), radiodonts (frontalmost appendages) and megacheirans (trunk).

The head of Kylinxia covered by a fused carapace with rounded genal corner comparable to those of the megacheiran Haikoucaris. Similar to the purported basal arthropod Opabinia, the head bears five eyes that are attached through eye stalks. Two of the eyes are at least double the size of the posterior three. In contrast to the fused proboscis of Opabinia and the hand-like great appendages of megacheirans, the head region of Kylinxia has a pair of unfused, 16-jointed frontalmost appendages each of which has terminal and paired, serrated inner spines (endites), similar to those seen in the radiodont genera Anomalocaris (overall proportion) and Ramskoeldia (endites). Unlike radiodonts, the frontalmost appendages face upward and lack outer spines, which is a feature shared by the great appendages of megacheirans.

Similar to the multisegmented megacheirans, the trunk of Kylinxia covers most of the body length and is composed of up to 25 metameric segments (tergites) each corresponded to a pair of appendages. Within the post-oral appendages, the anteriormost 4 pairs are reduced flap-like structures which arose from the head and two anterior trunk segments. The remaining appendages are all two-branched (biramous), with the leg-like inner branches (endopod) each composed of at least seven segments and the suboval outer branches (exopods) each possess marginal lamellae. The triangular pygidium covers at least 5 pairs of appendages, terminated with a three-lobed tail fan consisting of a middle and a pair of lateral lobes as seen in several Cambrian arthropods such as hymenocarine and fuxianhuiids.

See also
Erratus – Another taxon proposed to be transitional between radiodonts and euarthropods

References

Fossil taxa described in 2020
Prehistoric arthropod genera
Cambrian arthropods
Maotianshan shales fossils
Cambrian genus extinctions